Agryllus is a genus of cricket in family Gryllidae.

Taxonomy
Genus contains the following species:
Agryllus euzonus (Saussure, 1877) 
Agryllus excultus Gorochov, 1994

References

Gryllinae
Orthoptera genera